Hot R&B/Hip-Hop Songs is a chart published by Billboard that ranks the top-performing songs in the United States in African-American-oriented musical genres; the chart has undergone various name changes since its launch in 1942 to reflect the evolution of such genres.  In 1984, it was published under the title Black Singles through the issue dated October 13 and Hot Black Singles thereafter.  During the year, 19 different singles topped the chart, based on playlists submitted by radio stations and surveys of retail sales outlets.

In the issue of Billboard dated January 7, "Time Will Reveal"  by DeBarge was at number one, its fifth week in the top spot.  The following week it was displaced by "Joanna" by Kool & the Gang.  The year's longest-running number one was "When Doves Cry" by Prince, which spent eight weeks in the top spot between June and August.  Prince returned to number one in October with "Let's Go Crazy", on which his backing band the Revolution was also credited; he was the only act with more than one number one during the year.  "When Doves Cry" has been included on lists of the greatest songs of all time, including the Rock and Roll Hall of Fame's list of 500 Songs that Shaped Rock and Roll.  Both songs also topped Billboards pop chart, the Hot 100, as did five more of 1984's Black Singles number ones: "Hello" by Lionel Richie, "Let's Hear It for the Boy" by Deniece Williams, "Ghostbusters" by Ray Parker Jr., "Caribbean Queen (No More Love on the Run)" by Billy Ocean, and "I Just Called to Say I Love You" by Stevie Wonder.

A number of acts topped the chart in 1984 for the first time.  Rockwell gained his first chart-topper in March with his debut single "Somebody's Watching Me", which featured uncredited guest vocals by pop superstar Michael Jackson.  It was followed into the top spot by "She's Strange" by Cameo, the first number one for the band, which had charted regularly since 1977.  In June, O'Bryan achieved the first chart-topper of his career with "Lovelite".  "Caribbean Queen" became Ocean's first number one in September, and in December "Solid" gave Ashford & Simpson their first chart-topper, more than a decade after their first chart entry.  The duo was replaced atop the chart by Midnight Star with its first number one, "Operator", which went on to be the final chart-topper of 1984.

Chart history

References

Works cited

1984
1984 record charts
1984 in American music